The 2010 World Artistic Gymnastics Championships was held at the Rotterdam Ahoy indoor sporting arena in the Netherlands. The men's qualification was held on 18 and 19 October 2010. In this year's championships, there was a total of 73 participating federations with 615 gymnasts (343 men and 272 women). 53 men's teams competed.

Individual all-around

Floor exercise

Pommel horse

Rings

Vault

Parallel bars

Horizontal bar

References

2010 World Artistic Gymnastics Championships